is a Japanese female professional golfer who in 2007 at the age of 21 became the youngest player in the history of the LPGA of Japan Tour (JLPGA) to finish first on the money list. She also played on the United States-based LPGA Tour for six years.

Amateur career
Ueda was born in Kumamoto, Japan. She started playing golf at the age of nine, and entered the prestigious Sakata School at ten. In twenty three amateur events, she placed in the top 10 fifteen times, including three wins, and five second-place finishes.

Professional career
Ueda turned pro in August 2005 and won the JLPGA rookies cup that year. In 2006, she placed 4th in two JLPGA events, and tied for 9th in the Mizuno Classic, a joint JLPGA and LPGA event.

2007 was her breakout year on the JLPGA, with five wins, six runners-up, a 3rd and a 5th. Internationally, she represented Japan in the World Cup, and played in the Women's British Open at St Andrews. In April she won the Life Card Ladies at her home town of Kumamoto. She went on to win the Resort Trust Ladies and the Stanley Ladies, and placed 2nd in the Fujitsu Ladies, before winning the Mizuno Classic in November. A highlight of her tournament was a double-eagle during the tournament's final round. She became the tournament's first Japanese winner in nine years and only the 16th non-LPGA member in history to win an LPGA event. Two weeks later at the Elleair Ladies she won her fifth tournament and became the youngest money title winner in the history of the JLPGA tour.

Her win at Mizuno qualified her to play on the LPGA tour in 2008. In her first tournament of the year, the SBS Open at Turtle Bay, she finished fifth.

Ueda again won the Mizuno Classic in 2011. She birdied the 3rd hole of a sudden death playoff to defeat Shanshan Feng.

Professional wins (17)

LPGA of Japan Tour wins (17)

Co-sanctioned by the LPGA Tour.

LPGA Tour wins (2)

Co-sanctioned by the LPGA of Japan Tour.

LPGA Tour playoff record (1–0)

Results in LPGA majors

^ The Evian Championship was added as a major in 2013.

CUT = missed the half-way cut
NT = no tournament
"T" = tied

LPGA Tour career summary

Official as of the 2013 season

JLPGA prize money

* As of 13 June 2021

Team appearances
Professional
World Cup (representing Japan): 2007
The Queens (representing Japan): 2015 (winners), 2017 (winners)

References

External links
 

Japanese female golfers
LPGA of Japan Tour golfers
LPGA Tour golfers
People from Kumamoto
1986 births
Living people
20th-century Japanese women
21st-century Japanese women